Bayerotrochus boucheti is a species of sea snail, a marine gastropod mollusc in the family Pleurotomariidae.

Subspecies
 Bayerotrochus boucheti boucheti (Anseeuw & Poppe, 2001)
 Bayerotrochus boucheti mirificus Anseeuw, 2016

Description
The length of the shell varies between 60 mm and 70 mm.

Distribution
This marine species occurs off Norfolk Ridge, New Caledonia.

References

 Anseeuw P. & Poppe G. (2001). Description of Perotrochus boucheti sp. nov. from the South Pacific (Gastropoda: Pleurotomariidae). Novapex 2(4): 125-131
 Anseeuw P. (2016). Two new pleurotomariid subspecies from the South Pacific (Gastropoda: Pleurotomariidae). Visaya. 4(5): 43-57

External links
 

Pleurotomariidae
Gastropods described in 2001